The San Francisco Chronicle is a newspaper serving primarily the San Francisco Bay Area of Northern California. It was founded in 1865 as The Daily Dramatic Chronicle by teenage brothers Charles de Young and Michael H. de Young. The paper is owned by the Hearst Corporation, which bought it from the de Young family in 2000. It is the only major daily paper covering the city and county of San Francisco.

The paper benefited from the growth of San Francisco and had the largest newspaper circulation on the West Coast of the United States by 1880. Like other newspapers, it experienced a rapid fall in circulation in the early 21st century and was ranked 18th nationally by circulation in the first quarter of 2021.

In 1994, the newspaper launched the SFGATE website, with a soft launch in March and official launch November 3, 1994, including both content from the newspaper and other sources. "The Gate" as it was known at launch was the first large market newspaper website in the world, co-founded by Allen Weiner and John Coate. It went on to staff up with its own columnists and reporters, and even won a Pulitzer Prize for Mark Fiore's political cartoons.

In 2013, the newspaper launched its own namesake website, SFChronicle.com, and began the separation of SFGATE and the Chronicle brands, which today are two separately run entities.

History

The Chronicle was founded by brothers Charles and M. H. de Young in 1865 as The Daily Dramatic Chronicle, funded by a borrowed $20 gold piece. Their brother Gustavus was named with Charles on the masthead. Within 10 years, it had the largest circulation of any newspaper west of the Mississippi River. The paper's first office was in a building at the corner of Bush and Kearney Streets. The brothers then commissioned a building from Burnham and Root at 690 Market Street at the corner of Third and Kearney Streets to be their new headquarters, in what became known as Newspaper Row. The new building, San Francisco's first skyscraper, was completed in 1889.  It was damaged in the 1906 earthquake, but it was rebuilt under the direction of William Polk, Burnham's associate in San Francisco. That building, known as the "Old Chronicle Building" or the "DeYoung Building", still stands and was restored in 2007. It is a historic landmark and is the location of the Ritz-Carlton Club and Residences.

In 1924, the Chronicle commissioned a new headquarters at 901 Mission Street on the corner of 5th Street in what is now the South of Market (SoMa) neighborhood of San Francisco. It was designed by Charles Peter Weeks and William Peyton Day in the Gothic Revival architecture style, but most of the Gothic Revival detailing was removed in 1968 when the building was re-clad with stucco. This building remains the Chronicles headquarters in 2017, although other concerns are located there as well.

Between World War II and 1971, new editor Scott Newhall took a bold and somewhat provocative approach to news presentation. Newhall's Chronicle included investigative reporting by such journalists as Pierre Salinger, who later played a prominent role in national politics, and Paul Avery, the staffer who pursued the trail of the self-named "Zodiac Killer", who sent a cryptogram in three sections in letters to the Chronicle and two other papers during his murder spree in the late 1960s. It also featured such colorful columnists as Pauline Phillips, who wrote under the name "Dear Abby," "Count Marco" (Marc Spinelli), Stanton Delaplane, Terence O'Flaherty, Lucius Beebe, Art Hoppe, Charles McCabe, and Herb Caen.

The newspaper grew in circulation to become the city's largest, overtaking the rival San Francisco Examiner. The demise of other San Francisco dailies through the late 1950s and early 1960s left the Examiner and the Chronicle to battle for circulation and readership superiority.

Joint operating agreement

The competition between the Chronicle and Examiner took a financial toll on both papers until the summer of 1965, when a merger of sorts created a Joint Operating Agreement under which the Chronicle became the city's sole morning daily while the Examiner changed to afternoon publication (which ultimately led to a declining readership).

The newspapers were officially owned by the San Francisco Newspaper Agency, which managed sales and distribution for both newspapers and was charged with ensuring that one newspaper's circulation did not grow at the expense of the other. Revenue was split equally, which led to a situation widely understood to benefit the Examiner, since the Chronicle, which had a circulation four times larger than its rival, subsidized the afternoon newspaper.

The two newspapers produced a joint Sunday edition, with the Examiner publishing the news sections and the Sunday magazine, and the Chronicle responsible for the tabloid-sized entertainment section and the book review. From 1965 on the two papers shared a single classified-advertising operation. This arrangement stayed in place until the Hearst Corporation took full control of the Chronicle in 2000.

Push into the suburbs

Beginning in the early 1990s, the Chronicle began to face competition beyond the borders of San Francisco. The newspaper had long enjoyed a wide reach as the de facto "newspaper of record" in Northern California, with distribution along the Central Coast, the  Central Valley, and even as far as Honolulu, Hawaii. There was little competition in the Bay Area suburbs and other areas that the newspaper served, but as Knight-Ridder consolidated the Mercury News in 1975; purchased the Contra Costa Times (now East Bay Times) in 1995; and as the Denver-based Media News Group made a rapid purchase of the remaining newspapers on the East Bay by 1985, the Chronicle realized it had to step up its suburban coverage.

The Chronicle launched five zoned sections to appear in the Friday edition of the paper. The sections covered San Francisco and four different suburban areas. They each featured a unique columnist, enterprise pieces, and local news specific to the community. The newspaper added 40 full-time staff positions to work in the suburban bureaus. Despite the push to focus on suburban coverage, the Chronicle was hamstrung by the Sunday edition, which, being produced by the San Francisco-centric "un-Chronicle" Examiner, had none of the focus on the suburban communities that the Chronicle was striving to cultivate.

Sale to Hearst
The de Young family controlled the paper, via the Chronicle Publishing Company, until July 27, 2000, when it was sold to Hearst Communications, Inc., which owned the Examiner. Following the sale, the Hearst Corporation transferred the Examiner to the Fang family, publisher of the San Francisco Independent and AsianWeek, along with a $66-million subsidy. Under the new owners, the Examiner became a free tabloid, leaving the Chronicle as the only daily broadsheet newspaper in San Francisco.

In 1949, the de Young family founded KRON-TV (Channel 4), the Bay Area's third television station. Until the mid-1960s, the station (along with KRON-FM), operated from the basement of the Chronicle Building, on Mission Street. KRON moved to studios at 1001 Van Ness Avenue (on the former site of St. Mary's Cathedral, which burned down in 1962). KRON was sold to Young Broadcasting in 2000 and, after years of being San Francisco's NBC affiliate, became an independent station on January 1, 2002, when NBC—tired of Chronicle's repeated refusal to sell KRON to the network and, later, Young's asking price for the station being too high—purchased KNTV in San Jose from Granite Broadcasting Corporation for $230 million.

Since the Hearst Corporation took ownership in 2000 the Chronicle has made periodic changes to its organization and design, but on February 1, 2009, as the newspaper began its 145th year of publication, the Chronicle Sunday edition introduced a redesigned paper featuring a modified logo, new section, and page organization, new features, bolder, colored section-front banners and new headline and text typography. The frequent bold-faced, all-capital-letter headlines typical of the Chronicles front page were eliminated. Editor Ward Bushee's note heralded the issue as the start of a "new era" for the Chronicle.

On July 6, 2009, the paper unveiled some alterations to the new design that included yet newer section fronts and wider use of color photographs and graphics. In a special section publisher, Frank J. Vega described new, state-of-the-art printing operations enabling the production of what he termed "A Bolder, Brighter Chronicle."  The newer look was accompanied by a reduction in size of the broadsheet. Such moves are similar to those made by other prominent American newspapers such as the Chicago Tribune and Orlando Sentinel, which in 2008 unveiled radically new designs even as changing reader demographics and general economic conditions necessitated physical reductions of the newspapers.

On November 9, 2009, the Chronicle became the first newspaper in the nation to print on high-quality glossy paper. The high-gloss paper is used for some section fronts and inside pages.

Staff

The current publisher of the Chronicle is Bill Nagel.  Audrey Cooper was named editor-in-chief in January 2015 and was the first woman to hold the position. In June 2020 she left to be the editor-in-chief of WNYC, New York City. In August 2020, Hearst named Emilio Garcia-Ruiz the publication's editor in chief. Ann Killion has written for Sports Illustrated. Carl Nolte is a journalist and columnist. Tom Stienstra is a columnist.

Web
The newspaper's websites are at SFGate.com (free) and SFChronicle.com (premium). Originally The Gate, SFGATE was one of the earliest major market newspaper websites to be launched, on November 3, 1994, at the time of The Newspaper Guild strike; the union published its own news website, San Francisco Free Press, whose staff joined SFGATE when the strike ended. SFChronicle.com launched in 2013 and since 2019 has been run separately from SFGATE, whose staff are independent of the print newspaper.  across all platforms the Chronicle has 34 million unique visitors each month, with SFGATE receiving 135.9 million pageviews and 25.1 million unique visitors per month and SFChronicle.com 31.3 million pageviews and 31.3 million unique visitors per month globally.

Praise, criticism, and features
The paper has received the Pulitzer Prize on a number of occasions. Despite an illustrious and long history, the paper's news reportage is not as extensive as in the past. The current day Chronicle has followed the trend of other American newspapers, devoting increasing attention to local and regional news and cultural and entertainment criticism to the detriment of the paper's traditionally strong national and international reporting, though the paper does maintain a Washington, D.C., bureau. This increased focus on local news is a response to the competition from other Bay Area newspapers including the resurrected San Francisco Examiner, the Oakland Tribune, the East Bay Times (formerly Contra Costa Times) and the Mercury News.

Lance Williams and Mark Fainaru-Wada received the 2004 George Polk Award for Sports Reporting. Fainaru-Wada and Williams were recognized for their work on uncovering the BALCO scandal, which linked San Francisco Giants star Barry Bonds to performance-enhancing drugs. While the two above-named reporters broke the news, they are by no means the only sports writers of note at the Chronicle. The Chronicles sports section, edited by Al Saracevic and called Sporting Green as it is printed on green-tinted pages, is staffed by a dozen writers. The section's best-known writers are its columnists: Bruce Jenkins, Ann Killion, Scott Ostler, Saracevic and Tom Stienstra. Its baseball coverage is anchored by Henry Schulman, John Shea, and Susan Slusser, the first female president of the Baseball Writers' Association of America (BBWAA).

The Chronicle's Sunday arts and entertainment insert section is called Datebook, and has for decades been printed on pink-tinted paper in a tabloid format. Movie reviews (for many years written by nationally known critic Mick LaSalle) feature a unique rating system: instead of stars or a "thumbs up" system, the Chronicle has for decades used a small cartoon icon, sitting in a movie theater seat, known as the "Little Man," explained in 2008 by the Chicago Sun-Times film critic Roger Ebert: "...the only rating system that makes any sense is the Little Man of the San Francisco Chronicle, who is seen (1) jumping out of his seat and applauding wildly; (2) sitting up happily and applauding; (3) sitting attentively; (4) asleep in his seat; or (5) gone from his seat."

Another area of note is the architecture column by John King; the Chronicle is still one of the few American papers to present a regular column on architectural issues. The paper also has regular weekly sections devoted to Food & Home and Style.

Challenges
Circulation has fallen sharply since the dot-com boom peaked from around 1997 to 2001. The Chronicles daily readership dropped by 16.6% between 2004 and 2005 to 400,906; The Chronicle fired one quarter of its newsroom staff in a cost-cutting move in May 2007. Newspaper executives pointed to growth of SFGate, the online website with 5.2 million unique visitors per month – fifth among U.S. newspaper websites in 2007.

In February 2009, Hearst chief executive Frank A. Bennack Jr., and Hearst President Steven R. Swartz, announced that the Chronicle had lost money every year since 2001 and more than $50 million in 2008. Without major concessions from employees and other cuts, Hearst would put the papers up for sale and, if no buyer was found, shut the paper. San Francisco would have become the first major American city without a daily newspaper. The cuts were made.

In spite of – or perhaps because of – the threats, the loss of readers and advertisers accelerated. On October 26, 2009, the Audit Bureau of Circulations reported that the Chronicle had suffered a 25.8% drop in circulation for the six-month period ending September 2009, to 251,782 subscribers, the largest percentage drop in circulation of any major newspaper in the United States. Chronicle publisher Frank Vega said the drop was expected as the paper moved to earn more from higher subscription fees from fewer readers. In May 2013, Vega retired and was replaced as publisher by former Los Angeles Times publisher Jeffrey M. Johnson. SFGate, the main digital portal for the San Francisco Chronicle, registered 19 million unique visitors in January 2015, making it the seventh-ranked newspaper website in the United States.

Publishers
 M. H. de Young, 1865–1925
 George T. Cameron, 1925–1955
 Charles de Young Thieriot, 1955–1977
 Richard Tobin Thieriot, 1977–1993
 John Sias, 1993–1999. (First publisher not to be a member of the de Young/Cameron/Thieriot family)
 John Oppedahl, 2000-2003
 Steven Falk, 2003–2004
 Frank Vega, 2004–2013
 Jeffrey M. Johnson, 2013–2018
 Bill Nagel, 2018–present

See also

San Francisco Chronicle Magazine
 Chronicle Publishing Company
 Chronicle Books
 Chronicle Features
 KRON-TV

References

External links

 SFGate: Online version of the newspaper, contains freely searchable archive of all articles since 1995
 San Francisco public library databases , contains instructions on searching archived papers 1865–1922
 Hearst subsidiary profile of the San Francisco Chronicle

 
1865 establishments in California
De Young family
George Polk Award recipients
Hearst Communications publications
Daily newspapers published in the San Francisco Bay Area
Publications established in 1865
South of Market, San Francisco
Weeks and Day buildings
Newspapers published in San Francisco